TU Dortmund University is a technical university in Dortmund, North Rhine-Westphalia, Germany with over 35,000 students, and over 6,000 staff including 300 professors, offering around 80 Bachelor's and master's degree programs. It is situated in the Ruhr area, the fourth largest urban area in Europe. The university is highly ranked in terms of its research performance in the areas of physics, electrical engineering, chemistry and economics. The university pioneered the Internet in Germany, and contributed to machine learning (in particular, to support-vector machines, and RapidMiner).

History
The University of Dortmund (German: Universität Dortmund) was founded in 1968, during the decline of the coal and steel industry in the Ruhr region. Its establishment was seen as an important move in the economic change (Strukturwandel) from heavy industry to technology. The university's main areas of research are the natural sciences, engineering, pedagogy/teacher training in a wide spectrum of subjects, special education, and journalism. The University of Dortmund was originally designed to be a technical university, but in 1980, it merged with the adjacent Pädagogische Hochschule Ruhr that housed mostly humanities.

In 2006, The University of Dortmund hosted the 11th Federation of International Robot-soccer Association (FIRA) RoboWorld Cup. The university's robot soccer team, the Dortmund Droids, became vice world champion in the RoboWorld Cup 2002 and finished third in 2003. On 1 November 2007, The University Dortmund has been renamed as TU Dortmund University.

The University is part of the cooperation program "University Alliance Ruhr", together with the Ruhr University Bochum and the University of Duisburg-Essen.

On 4 April 2019, Ursula Gather, Rector of TU Dortmund University abolished the institutes for German Language and Literature as well as English and American Studies.

Campuses
Following the Zeitgeist of the late 1960s in Germany, the university was built "on the meadows" (auf der grünen Wiese) about  outside of downtown Dortmund. One of the most prominent buildings of the university is the Mathetower (Mathematics Tower), which houses the Faculty of Mathematics.

Faculties
 Faculty of Mathematics
 Faculty of Physics
 Faculty of Chemistry and Chemical Biology
 Faculty of Computer Science
 Faculty of Statistics
 Faculty of Biochemical and Chemical Engineering (BCI)
 Faculty of Mechanical Engineering
 Faculty of Electrical Engineering and Information Technology
 Faculty of Spatial Planning
 Faculty of Architecture and Civil Engineering
 Faculty of Business and Economics
 Faculty of Education, Psychology and Sociology
 Faculty of Rehabilitation Sciences
 Faculty of Human Sciences and Theology
 Faculty of Cultural Studies
 Faculty of Art and Sports Sciences
 Faculty of Social Sciences

Research

Over 1,000 third-party funded projects, including a range of collaborative projects, such as (transregional) Collaborative Research Centers, Research Units, Research Training Groups, a "Cluster of Excellence" and several Horizon 2020 research consortia. Nearly 300 professors teach and research at TU Dortmund University.

The university is particularly known for research in its four profile areas: Materials, Production Technology and Logistics, Chemical Biology, Drug Research and Process Engineering, Modeling, Data Analysis, Modeling and Simulation and Education, Schooling and Inclusion, in which it celebrates research successes beyond disciplinary limits, and at an outstanding international level.

Faculty of Computer Science
TU Dortmund (along with the universities of Paderborn and Karlsruhe) brought the Internet to Germany in the 1980s.

The first point of registration for .de-domains was at the Dortmund University Department of Computer Science in 1986. The national Domain Name System service was started in 1988.
The involvement of Dortmund University employees in internet registry and administration ended in 1993.
To this day, the university has registered the domain udo.edu (udo being short for Universität Dortmund), although the .edu-domain is today restricted to United States-affiliated institutions.

One of the four German competency centers for machine learning (Competence Center Machine Learning Rhine-Ruhr, ML2R), is located at the TU Dortmund. The machine learning software RapidMiner began at the TU Dortmund's artificial intelligence unit.

Honorary doctorates
Former president of Germany, Johannes Rau was awarded an honorary doctorate from the university in 2004.

Carl Djerassi was awarded an honorary doctorare for his science-in-fiction in 2009. Donald Tusk, President of the European Council, was awarded an honorary doctorate on 16 December 2018 for his contribution to European politics and the debate on European values.

See also
 ESDP-Network
 ConRuhr

References

 
Universities and colleges in North Rhine-Westphalia
Technical universities and colleges in Germany
Educational institutions established in 1968
1968 establishments in Germany